Mighels is a surname:

 Nellie Verrill Mighels Davis (1844–1945), US civic leader and journalist; her first husband was Henry Rust Mighels
 Henry Rust Mighels, (1830–1879), US journalist and politician
 James Mighels, British Naval officer, commanded in 1719
 Jesse Wedgwood Mighels (1795–1861), US malacologist
Philip Verrill Mighels (1869–1911), American Writer
Ella Sterling Mighels (1853–1934), American writer and historian